Chollima is a Korean mythological horse.

Chollima may also refer to:
 Chollima (magazine), a North Korean art magazine
 Chollima (website), a North Korean website
 Chollima Movement, a state-sponsored movement in North Korea to promote rapid economic development
 Chollima, a county of Nampo, North Korea
 Chollima Statue, a monument in Pyongyang
 Chollima Line on the Pyongyang Metro
 The nickname of the Korea DPR national football team
 Free Joseon, North Korean resistant movement formerly named Cheollima Civil Defense
 Ricochet Chollima, North Korean state sponsored hacking group